Joseph Eddy Alain Godin (born March 29, 1957) is a Canadian former professional ice hockey forward. As a youth, he played in the 1968, 1969 and 1970 Quebec International Pee-Wee Hockey Tournaments with a minor ice hockey team from Donnacona. Selected in 1977 by the Washington Capitals of the National Hockey League and the Quebec Nordiques of the World Hockey Association, Godin played parts of two seasons with the Capitals.

Career statistics

References

External links

Profile at hockeydraftcentral.com

1957 births
Canadian ice hockey right wingers
Hershey Bears players
Ice hockey people from Quebec
Living people
Quebec Nordiques (WHA) draft picks
Quebec Remparts players
Washington Capitals draft picks
Washington Capitals players